The 2017–18 South Dakota Coyotes men's basketball team represented the University of South Dakota during the 2017–18 NCAA Division I men's basketball season. The Coyotes, led by fourth-year head coach Craig Smith, played their home games at the Sanford Coyote Sports Center in Vermillion, South Dakota as members of the Summit League. They finished the season 26–9, 11–3 in Summit League play to finish in second place. They defeated Omaha and Denver to advance to the championship game of the Summit League where they lost to South Dakota State. They were invited to the College Basketball Invitational where they lost in the first round to North Texas.

On March 25, 2018, head coach Craig Smith was hired as the head coach at Utah State. On April 6, the school hired former Grand Canyon assistant and South Dakota alum Todd Lee as head coach.

Previous season
The Coyotes finished the 2016–17 season 22–12, 12–4 in Summit League play to win the Summit League regular season championship. As the No. 1 seed in the Summit League tournament, they defeated Western Illinois in the quarterfinals before losing to South Dakota State in the semifinals. As a regular season conference champion who failed to win their conference tournament title, they received an automatic bid to the National Invitation Tournament where they lost in the first round to Iowa.

Preseason 
In a poll of league coaches, media, and sports information directors, the Coyotes were picked to finish in second place. Junior guard Matt Mooney was named to the preseason All-Summit First Team and junior forward Trey Burch-Manning was named to the Second Team.

Roster

Schedule and results

|-
!colspan=9 style=| Exhibition

|-
!colspan=9 style=| Regular season

|-
!colspan=9 style=| Summit League tournament

|-
!colspan=9 style=| CBI

Source

References

South Dakota Coyotes men's basketball seasons
South Dakota
South Dakota
Coyo
Coyo